Triple J TV (stylised in all lowercase; formerly jtv) is the name given to a series of Australian television programmes which started broadcast in July 2006 as a television spin-off of national radio broadcaster Triple J.  They are broadcast on ABC1 and ABC2 as well as available online.  As with Triple J, it focuses on youth-oriented (18–35) programming.

A "teaser" web page and advertisements were released on the ABC in early July. The full site at http://jtv.com.au went live on 27 July 2006. jtv's first broadcast was on 28 July 2006, with the debut jtv live being broadcast the following night: a You Am I concert recorded at the Hyde Park Barracks in Sydney.

ABC TV's Rage music program has re-broadcast selected live concerts of triple j tv in each year since 2009, to make up for the lack of new release video clips available to the ABC at that time.

Programmes
Current programmes include:
triple j tv presents live video (various times on ABC1 and ABC2) – live concert events, similar to Triple J's Live at the Wireless show.
Hack Live – Tom Tilly Host live forums on some of the biggest issues for young people in Australia.

Former programmes include:
triple j tv with The Doctor (Monday night 9:05pm on ABC2 and late Friday night on ABC1) – Each week the Doctor is making a house call.
triple j tv (late Friday night on ABC1 and Monday night on ABC2), a look at triple j behind the scenes – including interviews, live performances and weekly Hack segment.
The Hack Half Hour (Monday night 8:30pm on ABC2), Steve Cannane talks about the issues that impact your life.
jtv (Friday night on ABC1) – a behind the scenes look at triple j, interviews, live performances, and weekly Hack segment.
jtv Saturday (Saturday morning on ABC1) – a music video show hosted by Rosie Beaton.  This programme featured a countdown of the Top 20 Super Request tracks, as voted by Triple J listeners and jtv viewers.
jtv XL (Tuesday night on ABC2) – an alternate version of the previous Friday's edition of jtv, often with extended interviews.
jtv live (various times on ABC1 and ABC2) – live concert events, similar to Triple J's Live at the Wireless show.
The Urban Monkey with Murray Foote – Sam Simmons' new comedy project.

Hack Live Specials
 "Australians On Drugs" (9:30pm Tuesday 28 July) ABC2
 "Australians On Porn" (9:30pm Monday 8 December) ABC2
 "Body Obsession" (9:30pm Tuesday 15 March) ABC2

List of tracks to reach Number 1 on jtv Saturday 
 29 July 2006 (Premiere episode) – "Supermassive Black Hole" by Muse
 5 August 2006 – "Supermassive Black Hole" by Muse
 12 August 2006 – "Smile" by Lily Allen
 19 August 2006 – "You Only Live Once" by The Strokes
 26 August 2006 – "Smile" by Lily Allen
 2 September 2006 – "Young Folks" by Peter Bjorn and John
 9 September 2006 – "Young Folks" by Peter Bjorn and John
 16 September 2006 – "Painkiller" by Freestylers feat. Pendulum
 23 September 2006 – "Gone" by The Butterfly Effect
 30 September 2006 – "Gone" by The Butterfly Effect
 7 October 2006 – "Fidelity" by Regina Spektor
 14 October 2006 – "Fidelity" by Regina Spektor
 21 October 2006 – "Welcome to the Black Parade" by My Chemical Romance
 28 October 2006 – "Welcome to the Black Parade" by My Chemical Romance
 4 November 2006 – "Love Like Winter" by AFI
 11 November 2006 – "Love Like Winter" by AFI
 18 November 2006 – "Love Like Winter" by AFI
 25 November 2006 (Season finale episode) – "Welcome to the Black Parade" by My Chemical Romance
 17 February 2007  (Series return episode) – "Knights of Cydonia" by Muse
 24 February 2007  "Famous Last Words" by My Chemical Romance
 3 March 2007  "Straight Lines" by Silverchair
 10 March 2007  "Knights of Cydonia" by Muse
 17 March 2007  "Knights of Cydonia" by Muse
 24 March 2007  "On Call" by Kings of Leon
 31 March 2007  "On Call" by Kings of Leon
 7 April 2007   "Ruby" by Kaiser Chiefs
 14 April 2007  "Brianstorm" by Arctic Monkeys
 21 April 2007  "Invincible" by Muse
 28 April 2007  "You've Had Your Chance" by Behind Crimson Eyes
 5 May 2007 "Hang Me Up to Dry" by Cold War Kids
 12 May 2007 "You've Had Your Chance" by Behind Crimson Eyes
 19 May 2007 "The Bird and the Worm" by The Used
 26 May 2007 "I Don't Love You" by My Chemical Romance
 2 June 2007 "D.A.N.C.E." by Justice
 9 June 2007 "Icky Thump" by The White Stripes
 16 June 2007 "Icky Thump" by The White Stripes
 23 June 2007 "Icky Thump" by The White Stripes
 30 June 2007 "Tie Up My Hands" by British India
 7 July 2007 "See You At The Lights" by the 1990s
 14 July 2007 "Recapturing the Vibe" by the Hilltop Hoods
 21 July 2007 "Tarantula" by The Smashing Pumpkins
 28 July 2007 "Recapturing the Vibe" by the Hilltop Hoods
 4 August 2007 "Teenagers" by My Chemical Romance
 11 August 2007 "Teenagers" by My Chemical Romance
 18 August 2007 "Teenagers" by My Chemical Romance
 25 August 2007 "The Pretender" by Foo Fighters
 1 September 2007 "The Pretender" by Foo Fighters
 8 September 2007 "You Don't Know What Love Is (You Just Do as You're Told)" by The White Stripes
 15 September 2007 "The Salmon Dance" by The Chemical Brothers
 22 September 2007 "Forever Song" by Josh Pyke
 29 September 2007 "If You Keep Losing Sleep" by Silverchair
 6 October 2007 "If You Keep Losing Sleep" by Silverchair
 13 October 2007 "Snakeskin" by Gyroscope
 20 October 2007 "Snakeskin" by Gyroscope
 27 October 2007 "Queen B" by Puscifer
 3 November 2007 "What If" by Cog
 10 November 2007 "What If" by Cog
 17 November 2007 "Flux" by Bloc Party
 24 November 2007 "Hearts a Mess" by Gotye (Note: this edition of jtv was a special countdown celebrating the top 20 Australian songs of the year.)

Logos

See also

 List of Australian music television shows

References

External links
triple j tv Site
jtv Archive Site

Australian non-fiction television series
Australian Broadcasting Corporation original programming
Australian music television series
2006 Australian television series debuts
Triple J